Nadia Litz (born December 26, 1976) is a Canadian actress and director.

Early life
Litz was born in Winnipeg, Manitoba. A former child actor, she has described herself as somewhat ambitious. She is of Russian, Polish and British descent.  She took an interest in films at the age of 6, and started living in Toronto at 17 to attend York University, but left to film The Five Senses. She also joined the 2,500 hopefuls who auditioned for the title role in the 1997 film version of Lolita, which went to Dominique Swain. She returned to York University to take film studies.

Film career
Litz would go on to achieve a long acting resume, although she often received no money for her parts and instead chose projects she liked.  In 1998 and 1999 she appeared in episodes of the Canadian television series Due South and Wind at My Back.  She starred in Jeremy Podeswa's The Five Senses that screened at The Director's Fortnight in Cannes.  She later received the title role in the short film Evelyn: The Cutest Evil Dead Girl (2002) by Brad Peyton.  That year, she also appeared in the television film Salem Witch Trials as Mary Walcott (here called May Walcott), and has starred in films such as Rhinoceros Eyes (2003), Love That Boy, and Monkey Warfare (2006) for which she won a Vancouver Critics Award and You Are Here (2011).

Her honours have included being named by Maclean's magazine as "25 People Under 25 To Watch" for The Five Senses, and being nominated for a Gemini Award for acting in the television miniseries After the Harvest.

While studying film theory, Litz briefly considered law school as a "fallback career possibility," although the law degree would be used for film production and not to leave the film business.  She explained to the press that "I work, but I work in independent films. There have been a few years that I have made a living and a few years that I haven't. It's a struggle for anyone trying to have a full-time career in film in Canada. Or anywhere."

Litz's graduating year she wrote, directed, shot and edited her first short film, on super 8 film called Remembering The Only Time I Tried To Stop My Heart From Failing (and Failed).

In 2009 she attended the prestigious Berlinale Talent Campus and studied under Janusz Kamiński and Tilda Swinton who were guest moderators.  Later that year, she was accepted as a Director-in-Residence to Norman Jewison's sought after program at the Canadian Film Center.  There she directed the successful short film called How To Rid Your Lover Of A Negative Emotion Caused By You! which made its world debut at the Toronto International Film Festival in September 2010, described by The Style Notebook as "one of the best films at TIFF this year!"

Litz also directed the 2016 movie The People Garden which starred Dree Hemingway, Pamela Anderson and François Arnaud.

Filmography

Film

Television

References

External links

1976 births
Actresses from Winnipeg
Canadian film actresses
Canadian people of British descent
Canadian people of Polish descent
Canadian people of Russian descent
Canadian television actresses
Living people
20th-century Canadian actresses
21st-century Canadian actresses
Canadian Film Centre alumni